Psycho is a 2008 Kannada-language suspense thriller written and directed by V. Devadattha. The film stars Dhanush and Anita Bhat in lead roles. It was produced by R. Gurudatth under the banner 4D Creations. Raghu Dixit composed the music, marking his debut.

Plot 
A lonely young man (Dhanush) lives in a horrific old house. His inner feelings brighten up when he falls for a girl named Pavana (Anita Bhat). He stalks her at every place, and he has a weird practice  of collecting her leftover things at every place she visits and maintains a gallery in his house. But he is unable to confess his love. This routine process occurs every day.

Pavana, an aspiring TV anchor stays in a working women's hostel. She finally gets an anchoring job in a reputed TV Channel. He becomes a huge fan and a regular audience of her show. One day, at her show he is finally able to talk to her on-air and she becomes intrigued by his sincerity. She requests him to sing and get impressed by the song's meaningfulness.

After the show while Pavana is returning to  the hostel, he finds out two rogues misbehaving with her in public. He beats them to a pulp and throws them at the hostel entrance. Hostel officials force Pavana to pack up and leave in order to maintain peace. He calls at her despondent and she answers very badly in a harsh manner, despite not knowing who the caller was.

Pavana starts living with her parents in their new home. At the housewarming celebration, he calls her with a new number. He introduces himself as her fan and congratulates her for making the right decision to live with his parents. Pavana insists him to call her during the show, not to call to her personal number.

Pavana with her parents visit a vehicle showroom to buy a new two-wheeler. Pavana selects one but hears the stock may need one and a half month. They make an advanced booking and leave. Pavana gets delighted to see the same vehicle delivered at her home entrance. Her phone gets a sms containing "You need to get it as soon as you want it" from him. She makes a call to that number but replies unreachable.

The next day, the stalker calls Pavana again to congratulate for getting what she wished for. She replies that she won't be impressed by such things and not to interfere in her personal life and shuts up the phone as she was on the way to her workplace.

One midnight, he calls Pavana again to meet him at Cubbon Park road at 5 AM; that he had something to tell. Intrigued, Pavana arrives at the time  specified. A priest shows up to give a saree with sacred offerings in the name of her mother. She questions him and he answers today is her mom's birthday. Returning home, her mother gets much delighted by the gift offered by her. Pavana expresses thankfulness to him for reminding her responsibility in family relationships. She also assures that she never ever express any boredom for his call at anytime and anywhere.

One afternoon, Pavana's father is admitted to hospital on a serious health issue. Her uncle who is also a doctor eases the situation. Her mother tells her to withdraw money from the ATM to pay the hospital bill and the father is discharged by the day. Due to out of cash issue Pavana had to reach to Main Branch. She returns to the hospital, but receptionist acknowledges that her father has been already discharged. She tries to reach them by phone, but the connection is unreachable. She rushes to her home, but gets panicked to see no one in the house. After a moment, Pavana opens the door and finds her parents at the doorstep. They were escorted by the stalker as Pavana was exhausted. Sooner after, He calls Pavana to inquire her father's health. She asks his bank account number to pay the debt. After payment she asks the cashier to give the account holder address. The cashier reads the address of a "Blind and Handicapped development charitable trust". She get impressed by his humanitarian value.

One day, He calls Pavana on phone. She expresses suspicion about the events happening in a filmy style. Creating the problems and then solving it. But she also has a strong hope that he is not of a bad personality. He replies that he'll keep up the word and will do anything for her. Pavana slowly falls in love with him.

One day, Pavana's cousin sister visits her home. Pavana, when asked about her love matter introduces him in her words and it is revealed that every time the stalker calls he uses different sim cards. She also says he sings unique poetry. Pavana's sister asks her to record his voice out of curiosity. On a call while talking with him, Pavana requests to sing the poem that was sung on the program. She secretly saved the recording in her phone. Pavana hands over the recording to her sister and goes to freshen up. While hearing the audio, sister gets shocked and immediately she moves toward her house. In her father's personal computer, searches an audio file. She takes both audio file and recording for Voice Analysis for which the software confirms the two voices are 100% matched. She explains to Pavana that the matched profile is a criminal psychopath and killed his own father mercilessly. Pavana was heartbroken and falls unconscious. Pavana dreams a horrifying nightmare which shows the stalker's violent nature. Suddenly she wakes up to see her parents around. At the same moment, The stalker makes a phone call to Pavana. But she harshly warns him not to involve in her life and do not call her forever.

Pavana's uncle, a psychiatrist comes to her home. He slaps his daughter (Pavana's cousin) for breaking the code of professional ethics. He also states that Pavana has come to a wrong conclusion. The stalker was under counselling supervised by her uncle. At his young age, he lost his only loving mother due to his father's alcoholism. To seek vengeance, he tortured and killed his father. His uncle covered up the scene to save the child's future. He admits him to the hospital for mental care. Soon after knowing Pavana, he was starting to transform into a normal human. In just 2 or 3 counselling sessions he could have been cured completely. After hearing this, Pavana rushes to the stalker's place to see he committed suicide for almost losing her. However he dies winning Pavana's love. At last the movie ends tragically, teaching us a moral.

Cast 
 Dhanush as An Unnamed Man
 Anita Bhat as Pavana

Music 

The film has six songs and an instrumental theme. The album was released on January 5, 2009.

The music was critically praised and described as "a sensation in the Kannada film music industry". Rediff wrote, "What makes Psycho click with the audience is its unbelievable music. There is magic in Raghu's songs and also in the background score. The songs that rocked before the film's release are wonderfully picturised". Nowrunning wrote, "Raghu Dixit has composed some unbelievable tunes in the film. Raghu has really brought out some freshness through his fusion music". Oneindia wrote, "One of the highlights is the music. The songs are good". Indiaglitz wrote, "The compositions are too good, sung in low, middle and high pitch. Psycho is a perfect mix of good film music. In the debut film music and singing Raghu Dixit has created a sensation".

The music was also well received by the audiences.

Reception

Critical response 

R G Vijayasarathy of Rediff.com scored the film at 3.5 out of 5 stars and wrote "But there are some minor aberrations too. For example, the characterisation of the hero and his uncle is little hazy. Plus, the suspense element jumps out of nowhere. It would have made more sense there was some kind of build up to the suspense. All in all, Psycho is a must see for all those who love suspense". A critic from Bangalore Mirror wrote "Dhanush’s identity is also well concealed through most parts of the film as he is made to wear a cap and shades. So, whatever facial expressions he has managed are also unknown. The others have managed a decent show. Cameraman Sabha Kumar and music composer and singer Raghu Dixit are the stars of this film. They put the much required zing into the whole affair. As an afterthought Psycho is worth the ticket price, but just about". A critic from Sify.com wrote "The two superb works have come from music director Raghu Dixit. All the songs are worth hearing again. Ninna Poojege Bandhe Mahadeshwara?., is the best among all. Sabhakumar camera work has been apt for the subject and he shows very good signs of good future".

References

2008 films
2000s Kannada-language films
Films scored by Raghu Dixit